The Grand prix de philosophie is an annual award created by the Académie française in 1987.

Laureates

References

Académie Française awards